Jean Pierre Marie Olivier Germain Defraigne (19 April 1929 – 15 March 2016) was a Belgian liberal politician and minister for the Liberal Reformist Party (PRL).

Career 
Defraigne graduated as a doctor in law at the Université de Liège and was a lawyer and alderman in Liège. He was member of the Belgian Chamber of Representatives (1965–1974 and 1977–1989) and senator in the Belgian Senate (1974–1977) for the PRL and was President (1981–1988) of the Belgian Chamber of Representatives of public work (1974–1976). In 1983, Jean Defraigne was appointed as minister of state. From 1989 to 1994 Defraigne served as a Member of the European Parliament, where he sat with the Liberal, Democrat and Reformist Group.

Sources

 Ministries, etc.
 Gouvernement Leo Tindemans II (11.06.1974 – 4.03.1977)

|-

1929 births
2016 deaths
Belgian Ministers of State
People from Roosendaal
Presidents of the Chamber of Representatives (Belgium)
University of Liège alumni
Walloon movement activists
Walloon people
MEPs for Belgium 1989–1994